The Vulcan name has been used by Kawasaki for their custom or touring bike since 1984, model designation VN, using mostly V-twin engines ranging from .

Model history

1984–2006: Vulcan 750 series

In 1985 Kawasaki launched, worldwide, the Vulcan VN700A, its first cruiser powered by its first V-twin engine. The VN700A has a shaft drive. Kawasaki also made the now rare VZ 750 variant with chromed wheel arches and other subtle differences. To avoid United States tariffs on Japanese motorcycles over 700cc, the initial US model was limited to 699 cc but in 1986, the tariff was lifted so the engine capacity was increased to 749 cc. Apart from paint schemes the Vulcan remained largely unchanged throughout its 22-year production run with only minor adjustments to components.

1986–2004: Vulcan 400 series
Kawasaki introduced the Vulcan 400 in 1986 as an entry level cruiser. For a first series, the Vulcan 400 featured a 398 cc liquid-cooled twin engine, and was fitted with a belt drive and six-speed transmission. The series 2 Vulcan 400 featured a 399 cc liquid-cooled V-twin engine similar in design to the 750. The series 2 was fitted with a chain drive and five-speed transmission to reduce cost and was produced in both Classic and Drifter variations.

1990–2009: Vulcan 500 series
The Vulcan 500 (EN500A) introduced in 1990 was the successor to the Kawasaki 454 LTD.  The EN500A was fitted with a parallel twin 498 cc engine nearly identical to the Kawasaki Ninja 500R.  It had a 6 speed transmission and belt final drive.  The EN500A was discontinued after 1996 and replaced with the Vulcan 500 LTD (EN500C).  Both versions were available as 1996 models.  With the EN500C the ergonomics changed as well as the engine tuning.  New cam shaft profiles and slightly lower compression pistons moved the power band down to increase low end torque.  Also the carburetors were downsized from 34mm to 32mm.  The belt final drive was replaced with a chain.  The Vulcan 500 LTD was discontinued after the 2009 model year for a nearly 20 year production run.

2015-present: Vulcan 650 S Series 
The Vulcan 650 S (EN650AF/BF) is designated as a Sport cruiser. Introduced in 2015 with an Ergo-Fit system designed for better custom comfort adjustability for different rider sizes. A choice of three foot peg positions, three seats and two handlebars are available to choose from, at time of purchase. The engine is a 649cc parallel twin derived from the Ninja 650. Retuned, heavier flywheel and redesigned intake give the Vulcan S more low and mid range torque. It has very non traditional cruiser looks with a unique frame and suspension layout.

 Vulcan 650 S/ABS
 649cc parallel twin, fuel injected (38mm x 2 with sub-throttles), liquid cooled, DOHC 8 valve, 10.8:1 compression ratio, 4-stroke engine
 9500 rpm redline
 46.3 lb-ft@6600 rpm, maximum torque
 Top speed ~120 mph (claimed) 
 6 speed transmission
 chain drive
 Frame Type: High-tensile steel diamond frame  
 41mm front forks, adjustable rear lay down monoshock 
 Front Brakes: 300mm single disc with dual piston calipers, Rear brakes: 250mm single disc with single piston caliper, with available ABS
 Fuel Tank: 3.7 gal (14 Litres)
 Weight: 498 lbs (226 kg)
 Seat Height: 27.8 in (706mm)
 Front Tire: 18" 
 Rear Tire: 17" 
 Wheelbase: 62"
 Rake/Trail: 31/4.7"
 Overall Length: 90.0"
 Overall Width: 34.6"
 Overall Height: 43.3"
 Ground Clearance: 5.1"
All Specs via

1987–2008: Vulcan 1500 series
The Vulcan 1500 Classic has a  liquid-cooled SOHC 50° V-twin engine with a single-pin crankshaft. It has a  seat height, wide handlebar, forward-mounted floorboards.

The Vulcan 1500 Drifter ceased production in 2005.
The Vulcan 88, with its 1464  cc liquid-cooled V-twin design was produced from 1987 through 1999.  A four-speed transmission was blended with the "large for its time motor" and offered consumers a big-bore metric cruiser that was comfortable and relatively light-weight at just over 600 lbs when "rider ready".

The 1500 Meanstreak was introduced in 2002 and lasted 2 years, before giving way to the 1600 Meanstreak. This performance version of the 1500 had the same basic engine as the 1500FI, but sported several upgrades including new camshafts, larger valves, larger fuel injection throttle bodies, new high compression pistons, and re-designed combustion chamber. It also had a slimmed down narrower gas tank. This meant an increase to 72 hp at 5500rpm and 90 ft-lbs at 3000rpm, while weighing in at a mere 637 lbs dry.

1995–2006: Vulcan 800 series
Two models of the Vulcan were discontinued in 2006 with the introduction of the VN900.  These were the VN800A introduced in 1995 and the first of Kawasaki's modern cruiser style.  The VN800A featured a softail design, bobbed rear fender and a 21-inch front wheel.  The second, the VN800B (Classic) was introduced in 1996 and had a retro styling that featured full fenders and 16-inch wheels on both front and rear.
 Vulcan 800A / Classic / Drifter
 
  liquid-cooled four valves per cylinder V-twin
 Single Keihin 36 mm carburetor
 Five-speed transmission
 Hidden mono-shock/spring back

2002–2008: Vulcan 1600 series
 Vulcan 1600 Classic
  SOHC liquid-cooled four valves per cylinder V-twin engine
 Five-speed transmission
 Vulcan 1600 Nomad
  liquid-cooled 50° V-twin
 Digital Fuel Injection with dual 36 mm throttle bodies
 Four valves per cylinder
 Vulcan 1600 Mean Streak
  liquid-cooled 50° V-twin
 Hydraulic Valve Lash Adjusters

2004-2010: Vulcan 2000 series
Based and built on the same frame, the Vulcan 2000 base model, Classic, and Classic LT have only subtle differences between the variations. The most apparent is the "bug-eye" chrome nacelle projection headlight that was first introduced on 2004 Vulcan VN2000A base model. This headlight was the only offering from Kawasaki until the introduction of the Vulcan Classic VN2000D in 2006, which employed a more traditional headlight. Also introduced in 2006, the Vulcan Classic LT VN2000F. The Classic LT had an appearance similar to the Classic but added saddlebags, windshield, passenger floorboards and passenger backrest to the offering. 
 Configuration
  52° V-twin engine
  torque @ 3,000 rpm (claimed) (rear wheel)
  @ 5,000 rpm (claimed) (rear wheel)
 Belt drive
 Electronic engine control unit (ECU) with fuel injection
 Forged pistons and alloy connecting rods
 Steel double-cradle frame with box-section single-tube backbone for strength
 Dual 300 mm front disc brakes with four-piston calipers and single rear two-piston disc brakes

2006-present: Vulcan 900 series
 Vulcan 900 Classic
  Liquid Cooled Fuel injected V-twin SOHC engine
50 HP @ 5,700 RPM
45.4 ft-lb TQ @ 3,500 RPM
 Belt drive
 Four-valve Cylinder Head
 Tank-Mounted Speedometer with Turn Signal Indicators and Caution Lamps
 Vulcan 900 Classic LT
 Same as the Classic, with the addition of:
Passenger backrest, saddlebags, windshield, and studded accents standard
 Vulcan 900 Custom
 Same as the Classic, except for:
 180 mm rear tire, and a thin 21-inch cast front wheel
 Smaller, lower-profile seat with smaller pillion
 Drag-Style handlebars

2009-present: Vulcan 1700 series 

 Vulcan 1700 Classic
  52° SOHC liquid-cooled fuel-injected V-twin engine
 Six-speed transmission
 "ride-by-wire" throttle
 Vulcan 1700 Classic LT
  52° SOHC liquid-cooled fuel-injected V-twin engine
 Six-speed transmission
 ride-by-wire throttle, windshield and leather saddlebags

 Vulcan 1700 Nomad
  52° SOHC liquid-cooled fuel-injected V-twin engine
 Six-speed transmission
 "ride-by-wire" throttle, windshield and hard saddlebags
 Vulcan 1700 Voyagers
  52° SOHC liquid-cooled fuel-injected V-Twin Engine
 Six-speed transmission
 Vulcan 1700 Vaquero
Since 2011.

References

External links

Vulcan
Cruiser motorcycles
Motorcycles introduced in 1984